Projects of Common Interest (PCIs) is a category of projects that the European Commission has identified as a key priority for interconnecting the European Union's energy system infrastructure. These projects are eligible to receive public funds. The PCI list is reviewed every two years.

Mission
Projects of Common Interest aim to achieve EU energy policy and climate objectives. These are affordable, secure and sustainable energy for all its citizens, and its 2050 decarbonisation of the economy in accordance with the Paris Agreement. Major infrastructure facilities that connect energy networks across the union boost the use of renewables and ensure that clean, secure and affordable energy can reach all its citizens.

PCI eligibility process
The project must have a significant impact on energy markets and market integration in at least two EU states. It must also boost competition on energy markets and help the EU's energy security by diversifying sources as well as contribute to reduce climate change and increase renewable energy utilization. The PCI list completes the regulatory proposals of the Clean Energy Package with a clean infrastructure dimension.

Process
PCI projects are first assessed to identify if they can effectively solve a need through infrastructure. Once they pass this test, they are assessed against the criteria set out in the TEN-E Regulation to identify their contribution to the implementation of the respective energy infrastructure priority corridor and their fulfilment of the criteria. Projects meeting all requirements of the Regulation and making the largest contributions are proposed for inclusion in the Union list of Projects of Common Interest. The list is adopted by the European Commission and published in the Official Journal.

Transparency and confidentiality
As part of the European Transparency Initiative, organisations should use the Register of interest representatives to provide the Commission and the public with information about their objectives, funding and structures. Contributions received from surveys and the identity of the contributors are published on the Commission's website, unless the contributor objects to publication of the personal information. In this scenario, the contribution will be published in an anonymous form. The protection of individuals with regard to the processing of personal data by the institutions is based on Regulation (EC) N° 45/2001 of the European Parliament and of the Council of 18 December 2000.

See also
 Connecting Europe Facility

Notes

References

Sources
 European Infrastructure
 Current Major European Projects
 Projects of Common Interest - EU Interactive Map
 Examples of Projects of Common Interest and their benefits

External links
Official website

Energy policies and initiatives of the European Union